The Mutual Fund Dealers Association of Canada (MFDA) is a Canadian self-regulatory organization (SRO) that provides oversight to dealers that distribute mutual funds and exempt fixed income products.  It is licensed under all Canadian provincial securities regulators (except Quebec, where it cooperates with the  AMF instead).  Its members consist of the distribution side of the industry that typically provide mutual funds and exempt fixed income products to Canadians through financial planners.

It works in parallel to another Canadian SRO, the Investment Industry Regulatory Organization of Canada (IIROC), which is responsible for the distribution of equities, ETFs, and other exchange traded products such as closed-end funds.

History
The MFDA was created in June 1998 through an initiative by the Canadian Securities Administrators (CSA) in response to the rapid growth of mutual funds in Canada in the late 1980s.

As of July 2013, the MFDA represented 115 mutual fund dealer members. These members include 81,134 approved persons and 359.4 Billion dollars in investor assets, commonly referred to as Assets under Administration (AUA).

As of September 2018, the MFDA represented 91 mutual fund dealer members. These members include 80,177 approved persons and $561 Billion in Assets under Administration ("AUA")   https://mfda.ca/members/membership-statistics/

As of October 2019, the MFDA represented 90 mutual fund dealer members. These members include 79,789 approved persons and $570.968 Billion in Assets under Administration ("AUA")   https://mfda.ca/members/membership-statistics/

As of February 2020, the MFDA represented 91 mutual fund dealer members. These members include 78,256 approved persons and $573.664 Billion in Assets under Administration ("AUA")   https://mfda.ca/members/membership-statistics/

Purpose and structure
The MFDA regulates the operations, standards of practice and business conduct of its Members and their representatives with a mandate to enhance investor protection and strengthen public confidence in the Canadian mutual fund industry.

The mutual fund Dealerships collectively and formally represent themselves to the MFDA through the Federation of Mutual Fund Dealers FMFD.

See also
Canadian securities regulation+
Autorité des marchés financiers (Québec)

External links

References

Financial regulatory authorities of Canada
Business organizations based in Canada